"A Soldier's Christmas Letter" is a song performed by British pop singers The Soldiers from their debut studio album Coming Home. It was released on 4 December 2009 serving as the album's second single. It peaked at number 65 on the UK Singles Chart.

Music video
A music video to accompany the release of "A Soldier's Christmas Letter" was first released onto YouTube on 24 November 2009 at a total length of three minutes and forty-one seconds.

Track listing
 Digital download
 "A Soldier's Christmas Letter" – 3:30

Chart performance

Release history

References

British Christmas songs
2009 singles
The Soldiers songs
2009 songs
Warner Records singles
Songs written by Jake Hook